99 Homes is a 2014 American drama film directed by Ramin Bahrani, written by Bahrani and Amir Naderi, and starring Andrew Garfield, Michael Shannon, Tim Guinee, and Laura Dern. Set in Florida, during the Great Recession, the film follows single father Dennis Nash (Garfield) and his family as they are evicted from their home by businessman Rick Carver (Shannon), leading to Nash choosing to help Carver in evicting people out of their homes in exchange for his family's home. Bahrani dedicated the film to the late film critic Roger Ebert.

The film competed for the Golden Lion at the 71st Venice International Film Festival. It won Grand Prix at 2015 Deauville American Film Festival. It also screened in the Special Presentations section of the 2014 Toronto International Film Festival. The film was released in a limited release on September 25, 2015 and wide expansion starting October 9, by Broad Green Pictures.

Plot
Recently unemployed single father Dennis Nash, a former construction worker in Orlando, Florida, is evicted together with his mother Lynn, a hairdresser, and young son Connor from the foreclosed home they share. Real estate operator Rick Carver is in charge of the eviction, and police officers who provide the enforcement call him "boss".  Dennis and his family move into a shabby, cramped motel room. Dennis goes to Rick's office and tries to take back his tools stolen by Rick's men. Rick sees the confrontation and is impressed by Dennis' gumption. He offers Dennis work as a repairman at his properties and Dennis accepts. Dennis soon becomes Rick's assistant,  helping to carry out evictions himself and quickly learning the real estate schemes that exploit government and banking rules to the disadvantage of struggling homeowners. It is revealed that Rick and Dennis have similar backgrounds and having seen how his father worked hard for no reward and seeing how stacked the system is against the common man, Rick reasons it's better to be the hunter rather than the hunted. Dennis takes a cut for the work he is performing for Rick and dips into the glamorous lifestyle in which Rick indulges. On his rounds he encounters the father of his son's best friend, but the man turned hostile toward Dennis when he saw him become part of Rick's eviction business. He says the eviction is illegal and will fight it in court.

Almost as soon as he begins working for Rick, Dennis tells Rick to keep the checks Rick offers as payment, so that he can buy back the house from which he was evicted. Rick warns him not to get sentimental about real estate and tells him to keep his money for now, since it is not enough to buy the house back. However, they make a deal with Rick to buy back his family's old house, but the legal process prevents them from moving in immediately. Nonetheless, he surprises his mother and son, showing them the house and telling them they will move back in.

Meanwhile, an evicted homeowner living in the same motel as Dennis and his family recognizes and threatens him. He denies knowing the man, but his mother and son are suspicious of how he's making money. Having witnessed the malicious calls Rick often gets, he decides to move out of the motel room immediately by selling the family home and buying a much more luxurious home instead.

When Dennis brings his mother and son to the luxurious house and informs them he bought it and sold their old house so they could get out of the motel room immediately, his mother does not believe at first that he has bought the house. Then Dennis' mother is shocked by the loss of their long-time home and is repelled as she realizes Dennis got his new-found wealth by helping Rick victimize vulnerable homeowners who have financial problems. Connor is also unhappy with the arrangement and sides with his grandmother as they leave Dennis to stay with her brother.

Rick puts together a multimillion-dollar real estate deal, but it is jeopardized by a legal case brought by a homeowner (the father of Connor's best friend) he is trying to evict. The deal is set to collapse if the homeowner wins as he asserts there is not a full set of documents to evict him. Rick forges the document and entrusts Dennis to deliver it to the court, which puts him in a moral dilemma. Dennis eventually obeys Rick's order to deliver the missing document to court that defeats the homeowner's legal case. The subsequent eviction turns into an armed stand-off. Fearing that the man, whose family is also in the house, will likely be killed in a shoot-out, Dennis falsely confesses to having forged the document. The homeowner surrenders, and Dennis is escorted to the law enforcement's car so that they can speak with Rick. Despite the apparent betrayal, Rick praises his actions, and quietly thanks him; presumably for taking the blame for the forged document. As Dennis waits in the car, the homeowner's son smiles at him, then quickly runs away.

Cast

Production

Casting
On July 24, 2013, Andrew Garfield signed on to play Dennis Nash, an unemployed contractor who loses his home to foreclosure. Later on September 13, Michael Shannon joined the cast of the film to play Rick Carver, who teaches Dennis the legal and illegal ins-and-outs of the foreclosure game. On December 10, Laura Dern also joined the cast of the film to play Lynn Nash, Dennis’ widowed mother, and on January 6, 2014, Noah Lomax joined the cast of the film to play Connor Nash, Dennis' son.

Filming
Principal photography, which began on November 18, 2013 in New Orleans, took a holiday break from Christmas to New Year on December 20. Later, the film resumed shooting on January 6, 2014. Whenever a close-up of Andrew Garfield's face is needed, Ramin Bahrani used a 24mm wide angle lens to emulate the thoughts of Garfield's character.

Music
The film's score was written by Antony Partos and Matteo Zingales.

Release
The film had its world premiere at the Venice Film Festival on August 29, 2014. and went on to screen at the Telluride Film Festival on August 30, 2014. As well as the Toronto International Film Festival on September 8, 2014. Shortly after, Broad Green Pictures acquired U.S distribution rights to the film. It went on to screen at the Sundance Film Festival on January 23, 2015. The film was released in a limited release on September 25, 2015. The film was released in the United Kingdom on September 25, 2015.

Reception

Critical response
On Rotten Tomatoes the film has an approval rating of 93%, based on 160 reviews, with an average rating of 7.50/10. The site's critical consensus reads, "Fueled by powerful acting and a taut, patiently constructed narrative, 99 Homes is a modern economic parable whose righteous fury is matched by its intelligence and compassion." On Metacritic, the film has a score of 76 out of 100, based on 31 critics, indicating "generally favorable reviews".

Richard Roeper of the Chicago Sun-Times called it "A provocative, visceral, sometimes heartbreakingly relevant drama/thriller."
Guy Lodge of Variety magazine wrote: "This dynamically acted, unapologetically contrived pic reps the filmmaker’s best chance to date of connecting with a wider audience—one likely to share the helmer’s bristling anger over corruptly maintained class divides in modern-day America."

Accolades

References

External links
 

2014 films
2014 independent films
2014 drama films
American drama films
American independent films
Films directed by Ramin Bahrani
Films set in Orlando, Florida
Films shot in New Orleans
Films set in the Great Recession
Drama films based on actual events
Broad Green Pictures films
Foreclosure
2010s English-language films
2010s American films